Horrors of Spider Island ("A Corpse Hung in the Web") is a 1960 West German horror film written and directed by Fritz Böttger, and produced by Gaston Hakim and Wolf C. Hartwig for Rapid-Film/Intercontinental Filmgesellschaft. The film stars Alexander D'Arcy as Gary Webster, a talent agent who invites several girls to a club in Singapore. Their plane ride ends abruptly when they crash-land into the ocean. Webster and the women make their way to an island where they find a large spider web. A giant spider sinks its teeth into Webster which turns him into a mutant.

The film was released in the United States in 1962, and has been released with various English titles including It's Hot in Paradise, Hot in Paradise, Girls of Spider Island, Horror On the Spider Island and Spider's Web. It was featured on the television series Mystery Science Theater 3000 in 1999.

Plot
Gary Webster (Alexander D'Arcy), a nightclub manager, flies a group of women from New York City to dance in his club in Singapore. While flying over the Pacific Ocean, their plane catches fire, splits in half, and plummets into the ocean; oddly enough, no one in Gary's group is killed. We next see the group a few days later, suffering from dehydration on a life raft, before they finally spot a small island and stagger to dry land.

Shortly thereafter, they discover fresh water and decide to go exploring. They are quickly relieved to find a cabin, but delight turns to horror when they open the door to discover a dead man hanging from a gigantic spider web. According to his journal, the man was a Professor Green researching and mining for uranium, but he feared something terrible was about to happen to him. There's no indication how long the professor planned to be on the island, but the women estimate there is enough food to last them about a month.

That night, Gary proceeds alone out onto the island where he is bitten by a giant spider and turns into some type of spider-man beast. He flees into the woods, leaving the women to wonder what has happened to him. The next day, seemingly possessed by uncontrollable violent urges, Gary kills one of the girls. The remaining women, still unaware of what has happened to him, have no idea that he is the one who has done this.

Twenty-eight days pass, and the women are running low on food when they spot a ship on the horizon. They are unable to signal it before it leaves, but two men Joe and Bobby arrive in a rowboat with supplies for the professor. They soon find the women, who tell them the professor is dead. As they all wait for the ship to return, they celebrate their last night on the island with a wild party. One of the men sneaks off to rendezvous with a woman, but both end up being killed by Gary. Finally aware of Gary's fate, the remainder of the group hunts him down with torches until he flees into quicksand and dies.

Cast

 Alexander D'Arcy as Gary Webster
 Rainer Brandt as Bobby
 Walter Faber as Mike Blackwood
 Helga Franck as Georgia
 Harald Maresch as Joe
 Helga Neuner as Ann

 Dorothee Parker as Gladys
 Gerry Sammer as May
 Eva Schauland as Nelly
 Helma Vandenberg as Kate
 Barbara Valentin as Babs
 Elfie Wagner as Linda

Source:

Production

The film was shot between October and November 1959 on location in Yugoslavia. Georg Krause served as the cinematographer, with Heidi Genée editing.

Release
The film was shown in Berlin on April 16, 1960. Pacemaker Pictures distributed the film in the United States, originally under the title It's Hot in Paradise in March 1962 with an 86-minute running time. It was later released with the Horrors of Spider Island title as part of a double feature with The Flesh and the Fiends in November 1965 with a 75-minute running time.  The film was featured on the television series Mystery Science Theater 3000 in 1999.

Reception
Author and film critic Leonard Maltin awarded the film 1.5 out of 4 stars, calling it a "well-photographed sex film, typical of the period", with sci-fi elements almost casually tossed in. Allmovie also gave the film 1.5 out of 5 stars, stating that "while the primary purpose of this German-made oddity is to show scantily clad women imperiled by a decidedly male beast, it's also attractively photographed, and several scenes (most notably, Gary's first post-bite attack, and his final flight through a swamp) deliver a frisson not usually found in nudie-cutie/monster movie hybrid". Brett Gallman from Oh, the Horror! panned the film, writing, "No matter which mode it's in, the film is mostly incompetent. Shots are staged with little imagination, the (presumably) stock music is often incongruous with what's on the screen, and the acting turns are woeful". Gallman also criticized the film's poor dubbing, monster design and frequent day for night sequences.

Mondo Digital.com gave the film a mixed review, complimenting its atmosphere while acknowledging the film's faults, stating, "While watchable even in its shortest version, Horrors of Spider Island becomes a delirious experience with the added nude swimming footage. The atrocious dubbing contains some of the more quotable one-liners around, while D'Arcy's weird but decidedly non-threatening monster makes up for the decided lack of actual arachnids on screen". 
George R. Reis from DVD Drive-In.com gave the film a positive review, commending the film's climax as "moody" and "well-photographed".

See also
 List of films in the public domain in the United States
 List of German films of the 1960s
 List of horror films of 1960

References
Notes

Bibliography

External links 

 
 
 
 
 

1960 films
1960 horror films
1960 independent films
1960s science fiction horror films
German science fiction horror films
German black-and-white films
Films about spiders
Films set on uninhabited islands
1960s German-language films
German independent films
1960s monster movies
Natural horror films
Sexploitation films
West German films
Films shot in Yugoslavia
Films directed by Fritz Böttger
1960s German films